Harold G. Long (3 September 1930 – 12 October 1998) was an American martial artist and an Isshinryu karate pioneer. He founded the Isshinryu Hall of Fame and was the second person inducted, with founding Grandmaster, Tatsuo Shimabuku being the first. Long achieved the rank of Jūdan (10th degree). He was a co-founder of the International Isshin~ryu Karate Association, and also served as the vice president of the United States Karate Association. He co-produced the first nationally televised  Isshinryu Hall of Fame Karate Tournament (1992), co-produced an instructional video series (1991) and co-authored seven books.  Shortly after Long's death, his student and co-author, Phil Little, fulfilled Long's goal of creating the United States Isshinryu Karate Association.

Background 
Born in Rockwood, Tennessee, Long attended elementary school in Petros, Tennessee and played football at Central High School in Wartburg, Tennessee. He joined the Marine Corps in 1949 and fought in the battle Chosin Reservoir (27 November to 13 December 1950).

Long married Doris Witsberger on October 18, 1952, in Wheeling, West Virginia, the couple had three sons, Richard, Michael and Gary.

Career 
While stationed in Okinawa, Japan 1957–1958, he petitioned to study Isshinryu under Tatsuo Shimabuku in Chan (Kyan) Village. He was accepted on his third visit to Shimabuku's dojo, and spent the next twelve months, dedicating eight hours per day to his training. Long's promotions from 1st Dan to 8th Dan were awarded by Shimabuku, his 9th and 10th degrees were awarded by the International Isshin~ryu Karate Association.

Long opened his first Dojo in Twenty-nine Palms, California, where he taught until his discharge from the Marine Corps, in July 1959. Upon his return to East Tennessee, he established a dojo at the Marine Reserve Training Center. At some point shortly after 1961, Long was appointed U.S. representative of the American-Okinawan Karate Association (AOKA).
 
The rules for kata and kumite were adopted at the first World Karate Tournament in Chicago, Illinois in 1963. Long proposed the majority the competition rules with John Keehan, Phil Kepal, George Mattson, Anthony Mirakian, Roy Oshiro, Don Nagle, Ed Parker, Wendall Reeves, Jhoon Rhee, Mas Tsuruoka and Robert Trias also in the committee. The rules adopted from this meeting serve all United States karate tournaments, regardless of style.

Returning to Okinawa in 1974, Long's plans for the International Isshin~ryu Karate Association (IIKA), gained the endorsement of Tatsuo Shimabuku before his passing in 1975. Upon Shimabuku's passing, Long became the legacy's patriarch and a senior Grandmaster of Isshinryu.

In addition to teaching at his Knoxville, Tennessee dojo, Long published a series of books and instructional videotapes. He was inducted into the Isshinryu Hall of Fame in 1981, and World Karate Union Hall of Fame in 1997.

Long retired from teaching in December 1995, but continued to represent Isshinryu Karate at public events for two more years. Long's dedication to Tatsuo Shimabuku and his Isshinryu style spanned 44 years.  In September 1998, Long was diagnosed with pancreatic cancer and was laid to rest on October 15, 1998, his final resting place is at the Oak Grove Cemetery in Rockwood, Tennessee.

Legacy bestowal
Prior to Long's death, he confirmed his desire for Phil Little to inherit the Shimabuku-Long Isshinryu legacy. On September 23, 1998, Grandmaster Long bestowed the 10th degree rank of Jūdan, his personal Isshinryu Karate belongings and his vision of the creation of an umbrella group, the United States Isshinryu Karate Association, (U.S.I.K.A.), to Phil E. Little. In consultation with the World Head Of Family Sokeship Council, and in deference to surviving Don Nagle, Little elected to forgo displaying his 10th Degree ranking for the remainder of Nagle's lifetime (April 5, 1938 - August 23, 1999).

Publications

Books

Harold G. Long and Allen Wheeler
 The Dynamics of Isshin-Ryu Karate, National Paperback Books (1978) 
 The dynamics of Isshinryu karate, book two, National Paperback Books (1979) 
 The dynamics of Isshinryu karate, book three,National Paperback Books (1980)    
 Counter-attack! : how to survive on the street as taught by the Isshinryu black belts, National Paperback Books (1983)

Others
 Okinawan weapons: Bo fighting techniques, National Paperback Books, by H. Long and P. Little,  (1987)
 Who's Who in Isshin-Ryu, National Paperback Books, by H. Long, P. Manis and T. McGhee, (1981)  
 Isshin-Ryu Karate – The Ultimate Fighting Art, Isshin-Ryu Productions, H. Long and T. McGhee,  (1997)

Video and television
 Co-produced an eight tape instructional video series, Isshin-Ryu Karate  (1991)
  Co-produced an eight tape instructional video series, Isshinryu karate : the ultimate self-defense (1991–92) 
Vol. 1 -Basics, Seisan & Seiunchin Kata
Vol. 2 -Naihanchin, Wansu & Chinto Katas
Vol. 3 -Kusanku, Sunsu & Sanchin Katas
Vol. 4 -Tokumine Bo, Urashi Bo, Shishi Bo, Bo-Bo Kumite
Vol. 5 -Kusanku Sai, Chatan Yara Sai, Tuifa & Bo-Sai Kumite
Vol. 6 -Kumite Techniques
Vol. 7 -Basic Self-Defense Techniques
Vol. 8 -Basic Self-Defense for Women (1992) 

 Isshin-Ryu Hall of Fame Karate Tournament (1992)

Events and milestones

References

External links 
 

1930 births
1998 deaths
United States Marine Corps personnel of the Korean War
People from Rockwood, Tennessee
American male karateka
United States Marines